is a Japanese film director and screenwriter.

Birth, education and career
Miyazaki was born in 1980 in Yokohama, Japan. He began making films while attending Waseda University in Shinjuku, Tokyo. In 2004, his thesis film The 10th Room won the Grand Prix Award at New York University's KUT Film Festival in Japan.

Selected filmography

References

External links
 

1980 births
Japanese film directors
People from Yokohama
Living people